The Scandal (Spanish:El escándalo) is a 1943 Spanish drama film directed by José Luis Sáenz de Heredia and starring Armando Calvo, Manuel Luna and Mercedes Vecino.

Synopsis 
Fabián Conde, a gentleman accustomed to living life without considering the future or taking into account the moral damage that his actions may have on the society that surrounds him, realizes the terrible mistake of his existence and the spiritual emptiness of the.

Cast
 Armando Calvo as Fabián Conde  
 Manuel Luna as Diego  
 Mercedes Vecino as Matilde  
 Guillermo Marín as Lázaro  
 Trini Montero as Gabriela 
 Porfiria Sanchíz as Gregoria  
 Juan Domenech as Gutiérrez  
 Carlos Muñoz as Juan de Moncada  
 Guillermina Grin as Beatriz de Haro  
 Manuel París as Felipe Núñez  
 Manuel Arbó as Don Jaime de la Guardia  
 Joaquín Roa as Un caballero  
 Concha Fernández as Leonor  
 José Sáez de Tejada as Demetrio  
 Juana Mansó as Francisca  
 Ricardo Calvo as Padre Manrique  
 José Luis Sáenz de Heredia as Croupier  
 José Portes as Alcalde 
 Manuel Requena

References

Bibliography 
 Labanyi, Jo & Pavlović, Tatjana. A Companion to Spanish Cinema. John Wiley & Sons, 2012.

External links 
 

1943 films
1943 drama films
Spanish drama films
1940s Spanish-language films
Films based on works by Pedro Antonio de Alarcón
Films directed by José Luis Sáenz de Heredia
Spanish black-and-white films
1940s Spanish films